Márk Magyar (born 28 April 1990) is a Hungarian pair skater who currently competes with Ioulia Chtchetinina; together, they are a three-time Hungarian national champion (2020–22). With his former skating partner, Darja Beklemiscseva, he won bronze at the 2017 Bavarian Open and competed at the 2017 World Championships. Earlier in his career, he skated with Anna Khnychenkova and Anna Marie Pearce, competing in the final segment at three ISU Championships.

Career

Early years 
Magyar began learning to skate in 1998. Competing in men's singles, he placed second to Tigran Vardanjan at the 2008 Hungarian Championships.

Partnership with Khnychenkova 
In 2009, Magyar teamed up with Ukraine's Anna Khnychenkova to compete in pair skating for Hungary. In the 2009–2010 season, the pair trained under Viacheslav Tkachenko in Budapest. They placed 15th at their first international event – the World Junior Championships, held in March 2010 in The Hague, Netherlands.

In the 2010–2011 season, Khnychenkova/Magyar trained in Toruń, Poland, and Budapest, Hungary, coached by Dorota Siudek and Mariusz Siudek. They placed 7th at a senior Grand Prix event, the Trophée Éric Bompard in November 2010. In March 2011, they finished 13th at the World Junior Championships in Gangneung, South Korea; it was their final competition as a pair.

Partnership with Foucher 
Magyar had a brief partnership with France's Camille Foucher. The pair skated for Hungary at two international events in February 2013; they placed 6th at the Bavarian Open and 7th at the International Challenge Cup.

Partnership with Pearce 
Around 2015, Magyar decided to compete for Hungary with Anna Marie Pearce from the United States. The pair's international debut came in October 2015; they placed 7th at the CS Ondrej Nepela Trophy and then 6th at the International Cup of Nice. In January 2016, they placed 14th at the European Championships in Bratislava, Slovakia.

Pearce/Magyar were coached by Stefania Berton and Rockne Brubaker in Geneva, Illinois.

Partnership with Beklemiscseva 
Around 2016, Magyar and Russia's Darja Beklemiscseva decided to compete together for Hungary. Making their international debut, they won the bronze medal at the Bavarian Open in February 2017. In March, they placed 24th in the short program at the 2017 World Championships in Helsinki, Finland. Trudy Oltmanns coached the pair in Shakopee, Minnesota until the end of the season.

For the 2017–2018 season, Beklemiscseva/Magyar decided to train with Robin Szolkowy, Maylin Wende, and Daniel Wende in Oberstdorf, Germany, and Zurich, Switzerland. The pair placed 8th at the 2017 CS Lombardia Trophy and 16th at the 2017 CS Nebelhorn Trophy.

Partnership with Kashitsyna 
In 2017 Magyar teamed up with Elizaveta Kashitsyna from Russia. In their one season together they placed twenty-eighth at the 2018 World Championships.

Partnership with Chtchetinina 
Magyar formed a new partnership with Ioulia Chtchetinina, a Russian who had previously competed for Switzerland. Chtchetinina/Magyar debuted on the Challenger series with an eighth-place finish at the 2019 CS Finlandia Trophy before coming fifth at the 2019 CS Golden Spin of Zagreb and winning the Hungarian national title. They were tenth in their European Championship debut, and were scheduled to make their World Championship debut in Montreal before the championships were cancelled due to the COVID-19 pandemic.

In the pandemic-affected 2020–21 season, Chtchetinina/Magyar made their Grand Prix debut at the 2020 Rostelecom Cup, finishing in seventh. Hungarian champions again, they went on to win a bronze medal at the International Challenge Cup before finishing fourteenth at the 2021 World Championships in Stockholm. This result qualified a berth for Hungary at the 2022 Winter Olympics in Beijing.

Beginning the Olympic season on the Challenger series, Chtchetinina/Magyar were eighth at the 2021 CS Denis Ten Memorial Challenge before winning a bronze medal at the Budapest Trophy. Assigned to two Grand Prix events, they finished sixth at both the 2021 Internationaux de France and the 2021 Rostelecom Cup. After a third consecutive Hungarian national title, they were sixth at the 2022 European Championships. Chtchetinina/Magyar were named to the Hungarian Olympic team. Unfortunately, days before the beginning of the Olympic pairs event, Magyar tested positive for COVID-19, and as a result, the team had to withdraw. Magyar lamented that "the work of a lifetime is gone."

Programs

With Chtchetinina

With Kashitsyna

With Beklemiscseva

With Pearce

With Khnychenkova

Competitive highlights 
GP: Grand Prix; CS: Challenger Series; JGP: Junior Grand Prix

With Chtchetinina

With Kashitsyna

With Beklemiscseva

With Pearce

With Foucher

With Khnychenkova

References

External links 

 
 

1990 births
Hungarian male pair skaters
Living people
Figure skaters from Budapest